The Saskatoon Smokin' Guns, formerly known as the Saskatoon Riot, were a baseball team based out of the Prairie League in 1996. The first half of the inaugural season saw the Guns' challenge for the division league but their first season under the new name they finished in 7th place with a 30-47 record. Attendance for the season was 22,991. Their player-manager was Andre Johnson, formerly with the Atlanta Braves and Chicago Cubs organizations.

Notable players included World Series champion outfielder Curt Ford (St. Louis Cardinals, Florida Marlins); RHP Jess Gonzales led the team in innings pitched (136), OF and former Chicago Cubs prospect Wayne Weinheimer (1969 - 2008), who led the team in batting average (.355) and home runs (11), and LHP Tim Oakes, who led the team in winning percentage (.800) and overall record (4-1).

Once again the team would change names to the Saskatoon Stallions who would also play out of Cairns Field.

The name was resurrected by a Junior AAA team; however there is no affiliation between the defunct pro team and the junior team.

References

Defunct baseball teams in Canada
Defunct sports teams in Saskatchewan
Sports clubs disestablished in 1996
Sport in Saskatoon
1996 establishments in Saskatchewan
Defunct independent baseball league teams